The 66th Evening Standard Theatre Awards were awarded in recognition of the 2021–2022 London Theatre season on 11 December 2022 at a ceremony at the The Ivy, London. Nominations were announced on 17 October 2022. The awards ceremony was compered by Sheridan Smith and co-hosted by Evgeny Lebedev, proprietor of the London Evening Standard.

Eligibility and nomination process 
All new productions and performances on the London stage between 20 May 2021 and 13 October 2022 were eligible for consideration.

On this year's judging panel were Baz Bamigboye, Sarah Crompton, Nick Curtis, Farah Najib, Alice Saville and Matt Wolf; chaired by the Evening Standard's Culture Editor Nancy Durrant.

Ceremony

Presenters 

 Stephen Graham presented the Natasha Richardson Award for Best Actress
 Josie Rourke and Martha Plimpton presented the award for Best Director
 Ana Wintour presented the Charles Wintour Award for Most Promising Playwright
 Evgeny Lebedev presented the special awards

Sponsors 
The headline sponsor was Garrard.

Non-competitive awards 
Special awards were given to Nica Burns and Dame Vanessa Redgrave for their outstanding contribution to and support of London theatre during the COVID-19 pandemic.

Winners and nominees

Multiple awards 
2 awards

 Oklahoma! (Young Vic Theatre)

Multiple nominations 
5 nominations

 Oklahoma! (Young Vic Theatre)

4 nominations

 Cabaret at the Kit Kat Club (Playhouse Theatre)
 Blues for an Alabama Sky (Royal National Theatre)

3 nominations

 A Number (The Old Vic)
 Red Pitch (Bush Theatre)

2 nominations

 Get Up Stand Up! (Lyric Theatre, Shaftesbury Avenue)
 Anything Goes (Barbican Theatre)
 Cyrano de Bergerac (Harold Pinter Theatre)
 The Seagull (Harold Pinter Theatre)
 The Father and the Assassin (Royal National Theatre)

See also 

 2020 Laurence Olivier Awards
 2022 Laurence Olivier Awards

References 

Evening Standard Theatre Awards ceremonies
2022 theatre awards
2022 awards in the United Kingdom
December 2022 events in the United Kingdom